"Forever" is a hip house song by American rapper will.i.am and DJ/Producer Wolfgang Gartner, released as a single on October 9, 2011. The track was released on Ministry of Sound and is included in Gartner's debut album Weekend in America. The track peaked at number 43 on the UK Singles Chart and number 9 on the UK Dance Chart, on the week ending October 15, 2011. Alternative artwork was released in the UK credited as 'Wolfgang Gartner featuring Will.i.am'.

Music video
The music video for the track premiered on June 1, 2011, via the official Ultra Records, a sub-label of Ministry of Sound, YouTube account. The video begins with a number of people dancing in a club. Two of them are showing entering the club toilets and engaging in sex. The scene cuts to will.i.am as a sperm, and continues by showing milestones up to and after his birth. It continues by detailing events in his childhood, before culminating when he is a full-grown adult. The video is three minutes and forty-nine seconds in length. A shortened version was released in the UK lasting two minutes and fifty-four seconds in length. It was released on August 9, 2011.

Track listing
 US Digital download
 "Forever" (U.S. Radio Edit) - 3:40
 "Forever" (Extended Mix) - 5:45

 UK Digital EP
 "Forever" (UK Radio Edit) - 2:52
 "Forever" (Extended Mix) - 5:45
 "Forever" (16 Bit Remix) - 6:13
 "Forever" (Kutz & Platonium Remix) - 4:15
 "Forever" (Kutz & Platonium Dub) - 4:36
 "Forever" (Tom Starr Remix) - 6:16
 "Forever" (Hook 'N' Sling Remix) - 5:41

 Promotional CD single
 "Forever" (UK Radio Edit) - 2:52
 "Forever" (Extended Mix) - 5:45
 "Forever" (Tom Starr Remix) - 6:16
 "Forever" (Hook 'N' Sling Remix) - 5:41

Chart positions

References

2011 singles
Will.i.am songs
Songs written by will.i.am
Hip house songs
Ministry of Sound singles
Wolfgang Gartner songs